John Basten (born 1947) is a former judge of the Court of Appeal of the Supreme Court of New South Wales who served from 2005 to 16 April 2022.

Education
Basten graduated in law, with first class honours, from the University of Adelaide. He subsequently attained a Bachelor of Civil Law degree from the University of Oxford.

Career
From 1996-99, Basten served as a part-time commissioner of the New South Wales Law Reform Commission. He was a member of the New South Wales Pay Equity Taskforce from 1996 to 1997, part-time commissioner of the Australian Law Reform Commission from 1986 to 1987, a lecturer in law at the University of New South Wales from 1974 to 1980, and a Bigelow Teaching Fellow at the University of Chicago from 1972 to 1973. He has also served as part-time Hearing Commissioner of the Human Rights and Equal Opportunity Commission from 1994 to 1997.

In 1992, Basten was appointed Queen's Counsel. He was appointed a Judge of Appeal of the New South Wales Court of Appeal in 2005. Basten has been the senior puisne judge of appeal since the retirement of Justice Ruth McColl in 2019.

References

Judges of the Supreme Court of New South Wales
Living people
1947 births
Australian King's Counsel
Adelaide Law School alumni
Alumni of the University of Oxford